NVE may refer to:

 MRAM pioneer
 Norwegian Water Resources and Energy Directorate
 NVE ensemble, in statistical mechanics is the simplest statistical ensemble
 Native valve endocarditis